The Westwood Regional School District is a comprehensive regional public school district serving students in kindergarten through twelfth grade from the communities of the Borough of Westwood and Washington Township in Bergen County, New Jersey, United States, two communities located approximately  northwest of Midtown Manhattan. The district is the county's only regional district serving grades K-12.

As of the 2020–21 school year, the district, comprised of six schools, had an enrollment of 2,796 students and 256.8 classroom teachers (on an FTE basis), for a student–teacher ratio of 10.9:1.

The district is classified by the New Jersey Department of Education as being in District Factor Group "GH", the third-highest of eight groupings. District Factor Groups organize districts statewide to allow comparison by common socioeconomic characteristics of the local districts. From lowest socioeconomic status to highest, the categories are A, B, CD, DE, FG, GH, I and J.

Awards and recognition
Berkeley Avenue Elementary School was one of nine public schools recognized in 2017 as Blue Ribbon Schools by the United States Department of Education.

For the 2000–01 school year, Brookside Elementary School was named a "Star School" by the New Jersey Department of Education, the highest honor that a New Jersey school can achieve.

Schools 
Schools in the district (with 2020–21 enrollment data from the National Center for Education Statistics) are:
Elementary schools
Berkeley Avenue Elementary School with 289 students in grades K-5
Michael J. Fiorello, Principal
Brookside Elementary School with 398 students in grades K-5
Thomas Conroy, Principal
Jessie F. George Elementary School with 274 students in grades K-5
Christina Scaduto, Principal
Washington Elementary School with 316 students in grades K-5
Melissa Palianto, Principal
Middle school
Westwood Regional Middle School with 640 students in grades 6-8
Shelley LaForgia, Principal
High school
Westwood Regional High School with 843 students in grades 9-12
Frank Connelly, Principal

Administration
Core members of the district's administration are:
Dr. Jill Mortimer, Superintendent
Keith A. Rosado, Business Administrator / Board Secretary

Board of education
The District's board of education, comprised of nine members, sets policy and oversees the fiscal and educational operation of the district through its administration. As a Type II school district, the Board's trustees are elected directly by voters to serve three-year terms of office on a staggered basis, with three seats up for election each year held (since 2012) as part of the November general election. The board appoints a superintendent to oversee the district's day-to-day operations and a business administrator to supervise the business functions of the district. Seats on the nine-member board are allocated based on population of the constituent municipalities, with five allocated to Westwood and four to Washington Township.

References

External links 
Westwood Regional School District

School Data for the Westwood Regional School District, National Center for Education Statistics

Washington Township, Bergen County, New Jersey
Westwood, New Jersey
New Jersey District Factor Group GH
School districts in Bergen County, New Jersey